Danny Summers (March 25, 1924 in Winnipeg, Manitoba – July 15, 1999) was a Canadian ice hockey defenceman who had an 18-year pro career, 10 of which were in the AHL and enjoyed a 20-year NHL scouting career for the Detroit Red Wings, New York Rangers and San Jose Sharks.

Summers was inducted into the Manitoba Sports Hall of Fame in 1995 as a Builder for his successful scouting career.

Awards and achievements
AHL Championship (1949)
WHL Championship (1956)
IHL Championships (1960 & 1961) 
Allan Cup  Championship (1964)
"Honoured Member" of the Manitoba Hockey Hall of Fame

References

External links

Danny Summers’s biography at Manitoba Hockey Hall of Fame

1924 births
1999 deaths
Canadian ice hockey defencemen
Detroit Red Wings scouts
Ice hockey people from Winnipeg
New York Rangers scouts
San Jose Sharks scouts
Winnipeg Monarchs players